Ngöbe Buglé may refer to:

Ngöbe-Buglé Comarca, an indigenous landbase in Panama
Ngöbe Buglé people, an indigenous tribe of Panama
Buglere language, also called the Buglé language
Ngöbe language, also called the Ngabere language
Chichica, Ngöbe-Buglé, capital of the Ngöbe-Buglé Comarca